The Bristol heart scandal occurred in England during the 1990s. At the Bristol Royal Infirmary, babies died at high rates after cardiac surgery. An inquiry found "staff shortages, a lack of leadership, [a] ... unit ... 'simply not up to the task' ... 'an old boy's culture' among doctors, a lax approach to safety, secrecy about doctors' performance and a lack of monitoring by management". The scandal resulted in cardiac surgeons leading efforts to publish more data on the performance of doctors and hospitals.

Dr Stephen Bolsin, joined the BRI team in 1988 and noticed high surgical mortality rates. As early as 1991, Bolsin raised concerns with high-ranking individuals at the trust and also contacted the NHS, the Department of Health, and the Royal Colleges. Bolsin was largely ignored until 1995, when Joshua Loveday died during a complex heart operation performed by Dr Janardan Dhasmana. After the death of Loveday, Bolsin emigrated to Australia. There he was praised for raising issues about the mortality rates at BRI and was promoted to professor. Subsequently, he was awarded the Royal College of Anaesthetists Frederic Hewitt Medal in 2013 in recognition of his contribution to patient safety.

An investigation chaired by Professor Ian Kennedy QC was set up in 1998. It reported in 2001, 
concluding that paediatric cardiac surgery services at Bristol were "simply not up to the task", because of shortages of key surgeons and nurses, and a lack of leadership, accountability, and teamwork. In five years (19911995), 34 children under one year of age died in this unit, who are believed would have survived in other NHS units (Ref ). Overall 170 children died in the Bristol unit between 19861995, who would have survived in other NHS hospitals, as estimated by Laurence Vick, the lawyer most closely involved in the Bristol Scandal. The same expert estimates that 2530 children suffered permanent brain damage after cardiac surgery by the Bristol surgeons over the same 10 year time span.

The NHS Plan 2000 published a year earlier, included the establishment of the Commission for Health Improvement, which was intended to tackle such problems.

By 2009, the mortality rate within 30 days of a child's heart operation in UK had fallen from 4.3% in 2000 to 2.6%.  Plans to reduce the number of centres performing children's heart surgery have been opposed. A report to NHS England in July 2015 proposed a “three tier” model for all hospitals providing congenital heart disease care. It suggested that they would work within “regional, multi-centre networks, bringing together foetal, children’s and adult services” and noted that since 2001 there “have been subsequent reviews each making a series of recommendations, but no coordinated programme of change, and concerns have remained”.

See also
Mavis Maclean
Criticism of the National Health Service

References

External links
Official Inquiry Website (in The UK Government Web Archive)

Public inquiries in the United Kingdom
Medical scandals in the United Kingdom
1990s in England
Hospital scandals
Health disasters in the United Kingdom
1990s in Bristol
1990 in England
1990 disasters in the United Kingdom